This is a list of episodes of the science fiction anime television series Noein. The series was produced by Satelight and directed by Kazuki Akane. with the opening and ending sequences directed by Kenji Yasuda. The series was originally broadcast in Japan on Chiba TV in 24 episodes between 12 October 2005 and 29 March 2006. It was released in Japan on DVD by Bandai Entertainment.

Noein is licensed in English by Manga Entertainment. It was broadcast in the United States by the Sci Fi Channel as part of Ani-Monday programming block starting on 18 June 2007, and in Australia on ABC2 started on 21 August 2007. In North America, the series was released on five Region 1 DVDs, the last released on 18 September 2007. In the United Kingdom, the first three volumes were sold individually, while the last two can only be purchased as part of a series collection.

Episode list

References

External links
 Official Japanese Noein website 
 Official English Noein website
 

Noein